Bubbly Lovely is a 2016 South Korean television series starring Wang Ji-hye, Kang Eun-tak, Gong Hyun-joo, Kim Min-soo and Kang Dong-ho. It aired on SBS TV from November 28, 2016 to June 2, 2017, airing every Monday to Friday evening at 19:20 for 120 episodes.

Plot
The story of a bubbly woman named Eun Bang-wool and her boss Park Woo Hyuk whom received a heart transplant from her late husband.

Cast and characters

Main cast
Wang Ji-hye as Eun Bang-wool
Kang Eun-tak as Park Woo-hyuk
Gong Hyun-joo as Han Chae-rin
Kim Min-soo as Kang Sang-cheol
Kang Dong-ho as Yoon Dong-joon

People around Eun Bang-wool
Kim Myung-soo as Eun Jang-ho
Lee Jong-soo as Yoon Dong-min
Lee Sang-in as Shin Ji-yeon
Sunwoo Eun-sook as Im Soon-bok
Kim Ha-kyoon as Yoon Ye-neung
Seo Eun-yul as Yoon Byeong-seon

People around Han Chae-rin
Kil Yong-woo as Han Young-mok
Jung Chan as Sun Woo
Kim Hye-ri as Na Young-sook

People around Park Woo-hyuk
Kim Ye-ryung as Oh Hae-won
Kim Yoon-kyung as Park Woo-kyung
Choi Wan-jeong as Chun Kang-ja

References

External links
  
 

Seoul Broadcasting System television dramas
Korean-language television shows
2016 South Korean television series debuts
2017 South Korean television series endings
South Korean romance television series
South Korean melodrama television series
Television series by C-JeS Entertainment